Alexis Coquillard (September 28, 1795 - January 8, 1855) was an American fur trader, explorer, and the founder of South Bend, Indiana.

Early life
Alexis Coquillard was born on September 28, 1795, in Detroit. He fought in the War of 1812 under William Henry Harrison.

His parents, Alexis Cerat (Serat) dit Coquillard and Cecile Tremblay, were born in Montreal, as were his paternal grandparents, Jean-Baptiste Cerat dit Coquillard (1716-1771) and Marie-Madeleine Jourdain (1719-1791).

Career
After the war, Coquillard moved to the St. Joseph River valley in 1823. Coquillard was involved in the treaties with the Tippecanoe and Chicago after the 1814 peace.

Coquillard was a friend to Father Edward Sorin, and was instrumental in the founding of the University of Notre Dame in 1842. His nephew, Alexis T. Coquillard, was one of the first students of the university.

Coquillard had been a fur trader, an industry heavily dependent on Native labor. In the period after Indian removal, he became a removal contractor, known as a “conductor,” capturing individuals who had evaded removal. In 1839, Coquillard built the first mill in South Bend with John A. Hendricks and John Rush. He also built a second flour mill called the Merchant's Mill. He established the Kankakee Race.

In 1840, Coquillard was appointed to assist with the Indian removal of the Potawatomi. Coquillard and Lathrop M. Taylor gifted land for the South Bend City Cemetery.

Personal life
Coquillard married Frances C. Comparet of Detroit. They had one child, Alexis T.

Coquillard died following a head injury from a beam falling during a fire at his mill on January 6, 1855. He died on January 8, 1855, at the age of 59. He was buried at Cedar Grove Cemetery on the Notre Dame campus.

References

External links

 Encyclopædia Britannica
 Alexis Coquillard Papers - Indiana State Library
 South Bend: History
 South Bend History Museum

1795 births
1855 deaths
People from Detroit
United States Army personnel of the War of 1812
American fur traders
History of South Bend, Indiana
Deaths from head injury